Hug Point State Recreation Site is a state park on the northern Oregon Coast in the U.S. state of Oregon. Administered by the Oregon Parks and Recreation Department, the park is open to the public and is fee-free.

Hug Point, the cape for which it is named, lies in the park.

Late 19th century stagecoaches that used the beach as a highway "had to 'hug' this particular point even at low tide to get around it", hence the name Hug Point.

Roadbed around the head

The primitive roadbed was chipped into the head by unknown persons around the turn of the 20th century to facilitate access to Arch Cape, which at the time was hug point only by driving a horse-drawn or motorized vehicle on the beach. This sometimes necessitated driving directly into the surf—an inconvenience in a stagecoach or wagon, but a real hazard in motorcars, which were far easier to get stuck and were disabled and immobilized by relatively small waves. A persistent rumor claims that the roadbed was made by a man whose brand-new Maxwell car got stuck and was submerged by the incoming tide in the 1920s; however, photographic evidence shows the road was there well before 1920, and Oregon popular historian Ralph Friedman interviewed a stage driver who remembered using it before World War I.

The  park has a large parking area, public restrooms, and a sloping walkway to the beach. Erosion has formed caves in sandstone cliffs along the headland's south side, which is also the site of a seasonal waterfall. The Oregon Coast Trail passes through the park along the beach.

See also
 List of Oregon state parks

References

State parks of Oregon
Parks in Clatsop County, Oregon
Oregon Coast
Headlands of Oregon
Landforms of Clatsop County, Oregon